The 1947–48 season was the 45th season of competitive football in Belgium. RFC Malinois won their 3rd Premier Division title. The Belgium national football team played 6 friendly games of which they won only one, against France.

Overview
At the end of the season, R Uccle Sport and K Lierse SK were relegated to Division I, while RC Mechelen KM (Division I A winner) and R Tilleur FC (Division I B winner) were promoted to the Premier Division.
K Tubantia FC, AS Renaisienne, Mol Sport and R Fléron FC were relegated from Division I to Promotion, to be replaced by RUS Tournaisienne, RCS Verviétois, US Centre and Sint-Truidense VV.

National team

* Belgium score given first

Key
 H = Home match
 A = Away match
 N = On neutral ground
 F = Friendly
 o.g. = own goal

Honours

Final league tables

Premier Division

Top scorer: Jef Mermans (RSC Anderlechtois) with 23 goals.

References